Qurbaghestan, also rendered as Qorbaghestan or Qarabghestan or Qarbaghastan or Qarbaghestan or Gherbaghestan or Gurbaghistan may refer to:
 Qurbaghestan-e Olya
 Qurbaghestan-e Sofla